Horace Harvey Cady (February 21, 1801 – October 29, 1887) was an American politician and farmer.

Cady settled in Mt. Clemens, Michigan Territory in 1821. There he settled on his farm. He served in local offices in Macomb County, Michigan. He served in the Michigan House of Representatives in 1843, 1865, and 1873–1874. He died in Mt. Clemens, Michigan. His brother, Chauncey G. Cady also served in the Michigan House of Representatives.

Notes

1801 births
1887 deaths
People from Mount Clemens, Michigan
Members of the Michigan House of Representatives
19th-century American politicians